Kilmastulla is a civil parish in the Barony of Owney and Arra, County Tipperary,  Province of Munster, Ireland.

See also
 List of civil parishes of County Tipperary

References

External links
 Townlands, Ireland

Civil parishes of Owney and Arra